The Strange Vengeance of Rosalie is a 1972 American thriller film directed by Jack Starrett and starring Bonnie Bedelia and Ken Howard.

Plot
A traveling salesman is lured by a precocious teenage girl to her shack in the desert for some sexual escapades. A scuzzy biker comes along, and they both find themselves dominated and tormented by him.

Cast
Bonnie Bedelia as Rosalie
Ken Howard as Virgil
Anthony Zerbe as Frye

References

External links

1972 films
Films directed by Jack Starrett
1970s thriller drama films
20th Century Fox films
Films shot in Almería
Films scored by John Cameron
1972 drama films
1970s English-language films